Khatkar Kalan is a village just outside Banga town in Shahid Bhagat Singh Nagar district (recently named Nawanshahr earlier the part of Jalandhar district) in the Indian state of Punjab. This place is famous for the memorial of Bhagat Singh, an Indian freedom fighter, who was born in Banga, present day village in Pakistan in 1907 and after whom the district is also named. Khurd and Kalan are Persian language word which means small and Big respectively when two villages have same name then it is distinguished as Kalan means Big and Khurd means Small with village name.

Neighboring villages that share a boundary with Katkar Kalan are Thandian, Dosanjh Khurd, Manguwal, Karnana, Naura, Kahma, Bhootan, Bhukhari and the Town of Banga.

Attractions

The Shaheed-e-Azam Bhagat Singh Museum opened in the village on the 50th anniversary of his death. Exhibits include Singh's half-burnt ashes, the blood-soaked sand, and the blood-stained newspaper in which the ashes were wrapped. A page of the first Lahore Conspiracy Case's judgement in which Kartar Singh Sarabha was sentenced to death and on which Singh put some notes is also displayed, as well as a copy of the Bhagavad Gita with Bhagat Singh's signature, which was given to him in the Lahore Jail, and other personal belongings.

References

History of Punjab
Tourist attractions in Punjab, India
Villages in Shaheed Bhagat Singh Nagar district
Memorials to Bhagat Singh